The Sword and the Cross is a 1958 Italian religious drama film directed by Carlo Ludovico Bragaglia and starring Yvonne De Carlo as Mary Magdalene. Shot in English and later dubbed in Italian, the film was released in the United States in 1960 as Mary Magdalene.

Cast 
 Yvonne De Carlo as Mary Magdalene 
 Jorge Mistral as  Gaius Marcellus
 Rossana Podestà as  Martha 
 Massimo Serato as  Anan 
 Andrea Aureli as  Barabbas 
 Mario Girotti as  Lazarus 
 Nando Tamberlani as Caiaphas 
 Philippe Hersent as Pontius Pilate 
 Rossana Rory as Claudia

Production
De Carlo was signed for the film in May 1958. The film's director, Carlo Ludovico Bragaglia, later remembered that the "producer, Ottavio Poggi, had sent the provisional script to America, so Yvonne De Carlo could read it and decide on her participation in the film. She read it and got very excited, agreeing to play the role of Magdalene."

Edgar G. Ulmer was reportedly preparing another project on Magdalene with Ottavio Poggi.

De Carlo left for Rome in July 1958. Filming took place in Rome in August through to November  1958 at Cinicetta Studios. A working title for the film was The Great Sinner.

Release
Although the film was shot under the English title The Sword and the Cross another Italian film with that name (Le Schiave di Cartagine aka Slaves of Carthage) starring Gianna Maria Canale and Jorge Mistral, was released un the US in 1960.

Critical reception
The Los Angeles Times called the film "sluggish".

Gary Allen Smith, in his book Epic Films: Casts, Credits and Commentary on More Than 350 Historical Spectacle Movies, described the film as "above average."

References

External links

1958 films
1950s historical drama films
1958 drama films
Peplum films
Italian historical drama films
1950s Italian-language films
English-language Italian films
1950s English-language films
Films directed by Carlo Ludovico Bragaglia
Religious epic films
Films set in the 1st century
Films set in the Roman Empire
Portrayals of Mary Magdalene in film
Cultural depictions of Pontius Pilate
Sword and sandal films
Caiaphas
Cultural depictions of Judas Iscariot
1950s multilingual films
Italian multilingual films
1950s Italian films